Kasgan (also Romanized as Kāsgān; also known as Kāskān-e Pā’īn, Gusāgān, Kāsahgān, Kāsehgān, and Kāskān) is a village in Arabkhaneh Rural District, Shusef District, Nehbandan County, South Khorasan Province, Iran. At the 2006 census, its population was 13, in 5 families.

References 

Populated places in Nehbandan County